The Lemon Bucket Orkestra is a Canadian self-described "Balkan-Klezmer-Gypsy-Party-Punk-Super Band" based in Toronto, Ontario, Canada.

Early history 

Founding member Mark Marczyk met bartender and musician Michael Louis Johnson in 2009 after returning to Toronto from Kyiv, Ukraine. Johnson introduced Marczyk to the Gypsy-punk band Worldly Savages. Marczyk joined them on fiddle. It was at after parties for the Savages' shows that eventual members of the band, such as Tangi Ropars and Os Kar, joined in on late-night jam sessions.

Eventually, the concept for the band was solidified during a conversation between founding members Mark Marczyk and Tangi Ropars in a Vietnamese restaurant in Toronto.

Other members began to join the band over the next few years, usually after seeing the group live. Many of these meetings were by chance or accident. By 2013, the group had swelled to 17 members.

The group were also involved in a collective known as Fedora Upside Down, a collection of bands, artists and theatre acts in the genres of singer-songwriters, improvized party brass, forró, flamenco, Brazilian percussion, ragtime jazz and others founded by Marczyk, Tangi Ropars and Dre Flak of Freeman Dre and the Kitchen Party. Lia Grainger in 2012 described Fedora Upside Down as a "motley assortment of cultural ambassadors."

In 2011, the band recorded an EP titled Cheeky at CBC.
The song "Tomu Kosa" was released as promotional single.
In November 2011, the group performed at a TSoundcheck event held by the Toronto Symphony Orchestra. Lemon Bucket was also broadcast Nationally and Internationally on CBC Radio in 2011 by Gilda Salomone.

Breakthrough 

In 2012, The Lemon Bucket Orkestra made headlines (such as CNN, CBC, Fox News and CTV), on their way to Romania for a three-week tour of the country, when they played an impromptu concert on a delayed Air Canada flight. While in Romania, the band opened for Taraf de Haïdouks. On their way back to Canada, the band once again performed aboard a delayed Air Canada flight in Germany, and then in Toronto Pearson International Airport upon arrival.

Toronto filmmaker Justin Friesen made a short documentary on the band titled Let's Make Lemonade. The film won Best Documentary and People's choice award in the Air Canada enRoute Film Festival. The film played in September 2012 at the Toronto Ukrainian Festival and was one of four Awards Finalists in the Air Canada enRoute Film Festival. The film played on Air Canada flights via the in-flight entertainment system from November 2012 – February 2013.

Lume, Lume 

In late 2012 the band released their first full-length album: Lume, Lume. Alan Cross described the sound of the album as "A traveling musical caravan burning wildly across the night sky". The following November, they began their Lume, Lume European tour, in support of the album. The tour took them to the countries of Romania, Serbia, Czech Republic, Slovakia, Hungary, Macedonia and Germany.

Upon their return to North America, the group participated as musicians in a collaborative theatre piece entitled Midwinter Night: Sacred and Profane Rituals, at La MaMa Experimental Theatre Club in New York City.

In September 2012, the band played with Romanian brass ensemble Fanfare Ciocărlia. This was repeated when they brought Ciocărlia to a sold-out show at The Opera House in Toronto on 5 July 2013.

On 8 July 2013, the group embarked on a third tour of east Europe, visiting Germany, Serbia, Poland, Slovakia, Ukraine, Romania and the Czech Republic. The tour was an ethnographic research tour, wherein the group accumulated new music and dances. Several of the songs the band learned on this tour ended up on the Moorka album, notably "Mirsa Reel" and "Dimineaca Pe Recoare", both of which were taught to the band by Nea Vasile and Taraful De La Mirsa in Mirsa, Romania.

In 2012 and 2013, the group sold out Toronto venue Lee's Palace three times: 31 October 2012, a Hallowe'en themed show; 16 March 2013, celebrating the band's third birthday and St. Patrick's day; and again on 25 May 2013, when they brought Friends Gypsy Kumbia and Roma Carnivale from Montreal. In 2014 and 2015, this trend continued, with their shows at The Opera House and Lee's Palace becoming regular sellouts.

In September 2013, the band was nominated in four categories at the Canadian Folk Music Awards: New/Emerging Artist of the Year, World Group of the Year, Traditional Album of the Year, and Instrumental Group of the Year. In 2015, they were vindicated when they won World Group of the Year at the Canadian Folk Music Awards.

In February 2014, Lume, Lume was nominated for a Juno Award in the category of Best World Music Album for the Juno Awards of 2014.

In March 2014, the band was nominated for an Indie Award by Indie88 for "World Artist/Group or Duo of the Year".

In mid-2014, the band embarked on its first cross-Canada tour, playing in various locations across Ontario, Nova Scotia, Quebec, Alberta and British Columbia.

Moorka 

In September 2014, the band began recording their second full-length album, following their cross-Canada tour. The album was recorded in a barn in Waterloo, Ontario.

Between January and February 2015, members of the group took part in a critically acclaimed dinner theatre performance about the ongoing Euromaidan written by bandleader Mark Marczyk and Marichka Kudriavtseva.

In February, the group announced the release of Moorka, and it was released 24 March 2015.

In August 2015, the group remounted Counting Sheep before heading on a fourth international tour from mid to late 2015.

In October 2015, they teamed up with a Korean Folk Ensemble Dulsori in South Korea, spending 3 weeks performing, as well as creating and recording music.

Upon their return, Lemon Bucket was awarded the title of Best Band in Toronto in Now Magazine's "Best of Toronto 2015" annual poll.

The album Moorka also won the title of World Group of the Year at the 2015 Canadian Folk Music Awards. Moorka was subsequently nominated for a Juno Award in the category of World Music Album of the Year.

If I Had the Strength 

In 2018, the group released their fourth full-length studio album, If I Had the Strength.

Discography 
 Cheeky – EP (2011)
 Lume, Lume – LP (2012)
 Moorka – LP (2015)
 Counting Sheep – LP (2016)
 If I Had the Strength – LP (2018)

References

External links 
 
 Lemon Bucket Orkestra at CBC Music (Canada only)

Musical groups established in 2010
Musical groups from Toronto
Canadian folk music groups
Canadian world music groups
2010 establishments in Ontario
Canadian Folk Music Award winners